The McKenzie Well (also known as McKenzie #1) is an oil well site in Boulder, Colorado. The Boulder Oil Field was discovered on this site in 1901, making it the oldest oil-producing site in the entire Denver Basin, and one of the oldest in the western United States. The first producing well on the site was drilled in 1902. Peak production at 85,000 barrels was reached in 1909.

A modern well (built in the 1960s) sits on the site of the original discovery; nothing remains of the original machinery.

The McKenzie Well site is listed on the National Register of Historic Places and the Colorado State Register of Historic Properties.

References

External links and references

 Grace Hood, Eye of the beholder: Oil well takes its place in Boulder's history, Boulder Weekly, 3/31/2005

Infrastructure completed in 1901
Industrial buildings and structures on the National Register of Historic Places in Colorado
Buildings and structures in Boulder, Colorado
National Register of Historic Places in Boulder County, Colorado
1901 establishments in Colorado
Oil wells on the National Register of Historic Places